Mount Gilbert Community College was a mixed, non-denominational secondary school created in 1993 as an amalgamation of Forth River and Cairnmartin secondary schools. It had about 500 pupils then, but the number dropped to half that in 2001. The Belfast Education and Library Board recommended its closure and Maria Eagle, Education Minister announced that the school would close by the end of August 2007.

Located at 237 Ballygomartin Road, the school was based in the Shankill area of Belfast. The main alternative school is Castle High School, just off the Shore Road on Fortwilliam Park.

References

External links
 BBC report on closure of Mount Gilbert
Castle High School official website

Defunct schools in Northern Ireland
Secondary schools in Belfast
Educational institutions established in 1993
Educational institutions disestablished in 2007
1993 establishments in Northern Ireland